Paolo Soleri (21 June 1919 – 9 April 2013) was an Italian-born American architect. He established the educational Cosanti Foundation and Arcosanti. Soleri was a lecturer in the College of Architecture at Arizona State University and a National Design Award recipient in 2006. He coined the concept of 'arcology' – a synthesis of architecture and ecology as the philosophy of democratic society.   He died at home of natural causes on 9 April 2013 at the age of 93.

Soleri authored several books, including The Bridge Between Matter & Spirit is Matter Becoming Spirit and Arcology – City In the Image of Man.

Personal life
Soleri was born in Turin, Italy, Europe. He was awarded his "laurea" (master's degree) in architecture from the Politecnico di Torino in 1946. He visited the United States in December 1946 and spent a year and a half in fellowship with Frank Lloyd Wright at Taliesin West in Arizona, and at Taliesin in Spring Green, Wisconsin. During this time, he gained international recognition for a bridge design that was displayed at the Museum of Modern Art.

In 1950, Soleri, with his wife Colly (née Corolyn Woods), returned to Italy where he was commissioned to build a large ceramics factory, Ceramica Artistica Solimene, in Vietri on the Amalfi coast.

Soleri adapted ceramics industry processes learned at this time to use in his award-winning designs and production of ceramic and bronze windbells and silt-cast architectural structures. For more than 40 years, proceeds from sales of the wind-bells have been an important source of funds for construction that is meant to test his theoretical work. Ceramic and bronze bells continue to be produced and sold at Arcosanti and Cosanti in Arizona.

In 1956, Soleri settled in Scottsdale, Arizona, with Colly and the elder of their two daughters; the younger was born in Arizona. He began building Arcosanti in 1970 with the help of architecture and design students, as a place to test his urban design hypotheses. This "urban laboratory" (so-dubbed by Ada Louise Huxtable, who at the time was the architecture critic of The New York Times) became internationally renowned.

Paolo and Colly Soleri made a lifelong commitment to research and experimentation in urban planning. They established the Cosanti Foundation, a not-for-profit 501(c)(3) educational non-profit foundation. Soleri's philosophy and works were strongly influenced by the Jesuit paleontologist and philosopher Pierre Teilhard de Chardin.

Soleri died on 9 April 2013 and was buried at Arcosanti in its private cemetery, beside his wife.

Arcosanti

The Cosanti Foundation's major project is Arcosanti. Arcosanti, as originally designed by Soleri, was intended for 5,000 people; it has been in construction since 1970. Arcology was envisioned by Soleri as a hyper-dense city, designed to: maximize human interaction with ready access to shared, cost-effective infrastructural services; conserve water and reduce sewage; minimize the use of energy, raw materials and land; reduce waste and environmental pollution; increase interaction with the surrounding natural environment. In 2010, construction was underway to complete Arcosanti's Greenhouse Apron, but that initiative was put on hold not long after Soleri's death in 2013.

Arcosanti is intended as a prototype of a desert arcology. Soleri's other arcology designs envisioned sites such as the ocean (Nova Noah), et al. (see: Arcology: City in the Image of Man). Since 1970, over 7000 people have participated in Arcosanti's construction.  Their international affiliation group is called the Arcosanti Alumni Network.

Career
The International Architecture Symposium "Mensch und Raum" (Man and Space) at the Vienna University of Technology in 1984 received international attention. Paolo Soleri participated with, among others: Justus Dahinden, Dennis Sharp, Bruno Zevi, Jorge Glusberg, Otto Kapfinger, Frei Otto, Pierre Vago, Ernst Gisel, and Ionel Schein.

Soleri was a distinguished lecturer in the College of Architecture at Arizona State University and a member of the Lindisfarne Association.

In 1966, Paolo Soleri began working on the design for the Paolo Soleri Amphitheater in Santa Fe, New Mexico. It was built for the IAIA (Institute of American Indian Arts) on what is now the campus of the Santa Fe Indian School using large silt cast forms. The property is owned by the nineteen Native American Pueblos of New Mexico and is therefore not protected by local or state preservation laws.

A landmark exhibition, "City in the Image of Man – The Architectural Visions of Paolo Soleri", organized in 1970 by the Corcoran Gallery of Art in Washington, DC, traveled extensively thereafter in the U.S. and Canada, breaking records for attendance. "Two Suns Arcology, A Concept for Future Cities" opened in 1976 at the Xerox Square Center in Rochester, New York. In 1989, "Paolo Soleri Habitats: Ecologic Minutiae", an exhibition of arcologies, space habitats, and bridges, was presented at the New York Academy of Sciences. More recently, "Soleri's Cities, Architecture for the Planet Earth and Beyond" was featured at the Scottsdale Center for the Arts in Scottsdale, AZ. A Soleri bell appears in the film What the *Bleep* Do We Know? His work has been exhibited worldwide.

In 1976, Paolo Soleri was a key participant at UN Habitat I, the first UN forum on human settlements, held it Vancouver, British Columbia, Canada, North America. Soleri appeared there together with Buckminster Fuller.

The Paolo Soleri Archives, the collection of Soleri's drawings and writings, is located at Arcosanti. The Soleri Archives is managed by Sue Kirsch.

An interview with Soleri was featured in the environmental documentary The 11th Hour (2007).

On 10 December 2010, the Soleri Bridge and Plaza was completed. The structure had been commissioned by Scottsdale Public Art. The  pedestrian bridge based on Paolo Soleri's design is located on the South Bank of the Arizona Canal and connects a developed retail area of the Scottsdale Waterfront with Old Town Scottsdale. The bridge is incorporated into a  plaza including silt cast artwork, as well as a large bell assembly called The Goldwater Bell, also designed by Paolo Soleri.

The feature-length documentary film The Vision Of Paolo Soleri: Prophet In The Desert (2013) contains interviews with Morley Safer, Paul Goldberger, Catherine Hardwicke, Will Bruder, Jean-Michel Cousteau, Steven Holl, and Eric Lloyd Wright.

Awards
Soleri received fellowships from the Graham Foundation and from the Guggenheim Foundation (1964, Architecture, Planning, & Design). He was awarded three honorary doctorates and several awards from design groups worldwide:
 1963 – American Institute of Architects Gold Medal for Craftmanship
 1981 – Gold Medal at the World Bienniale of Architecture held by the International Academy of Architecture in Sofia, Bulgaria
 1984 – Silver Medal of the Academie d' Architecture in Paris
 1996 – Honorary Fellow, Royal Institute of British Architects
 2000 – Leone d'oro at the Venice Biennale of Architecture for his lifelong achievement
 2006 – Cooper Hewitt National Design Award for lifetime achievement

Sexual abuse allegation 
In October 2010, Daniela Soleri – Paolo Soleri's daughter – resigned from the Cosanti Foundation board, citing abuse by her father. She stated that some of Soleri's inner circle had been told decades earlier, but nothing had been done about it at the time. After the resignation, Soleri stepped down as chairman, but the board made no public statement on the reasons.

After the Scottsdale Museum of Contemporary Art had a major retrospective exhibition on Paolo Soleri in October 2017, Daniela published an article on the website Medium on 13 November 2017 accusing her father of persistent sexual abuse, writing: "In my early adolescence, my father, an architect and craftsman, began sexually molesting me, eventually attempting rape when I was 17." Encouraged to publish the article by the #MeToo movement, Daniela wrote that she had already come forward to many of her father's colleagues but received little response:

In the article, Daniela wrote about her lingering admiration for some of Soleri's work and ideas. However, she also warned against uncritical praise of artists with abusive tendencies and the tendency to "accept abusive behavior as a necessary and justified cost for the contributions of intellect or creativity". Of her father, Daniela wrote:

As noted in Dezeen, Daniela's article suggested that she had approached The New York Times or other news publishers to discuss her father's abuse, but had been turned away. The Cosanti Foundation Board released an official statement in response to Daniela Soleri's:

Curbed editor-in-chief Kelsey Keith wrote "[Daniela] Soleri's account is breathtaking not only for its thorough and very personal reckoning with the truth, but for its clear-eyed articulation of the reasons why assigning all intellectual power to a solitary genius is so harmful." Keith noted that architecture as a profession "hasn't (yet) experienced its Weinstein moment", referring to the Harvey Weinstein sexual abuse allegations and the resulting "Weinstein effect" of reporting sexual misconduct committed by powerful men in media and other industries. In a 2018 Curbed article, Hilary George-Parkin said: "While Hollywood, tech, sports, media, politics, the restaurant industry, and others are reeling from high-profile revelations and resignations, the design world has remained—with the notable exception of Daniela Soleri's account of sexual abuse by her father, architect Paolo Soleri—mostly undisturbed in the public realm."

See also
 Buckminster Fuller
 Jacque Fresco

References
Notes

Bibliography
 S. Suatoni (a cura di) 'Paolo Soleri. Etica e Invenzione Urbana', catalogo della mostra, Roma 8 ottobre 2005 – 8 gennaio 2006 (Istituto Nazionale per la Grafica, Maxxi, Casa dell'Architettura), Roma Palombi, Jaca book 2006

External links

 Emanuele Piccardo, an interview at Cosanti in 2006
 Lisa A. Scafuro. Phoenix Home & Garden. March, 2008, p. 270.  “Paolo Soleri: The Lifetime Achievements of a Living Legacy”  
 Jared Keller article about Soleri urbanistic envisions. "Desert Utopia"

1919 births
2013 deaths
20th-century Italian architects
20th-century American architects
American architecture writers
American male non-fiction writers
Italian emigrants to the United States
American urban planners
Defunct architecture firms based in Arizona
Architectural theoreticians
Arizona State University faculty
Italian urban planners
National Design Award winners
People from Paradise Valley, Arizona
Architects from Turin
Architects from Arizona